Suisuimënë or Xuixuimënë is an Apalaí-Wayana village on the Eastern Paru River in the state of Pará in Brazil. Suisuimënë is one of the larger villages along the Paru river and has an airstrip.

Jehje Wayana is the chief of the village.

Apart from its Apalaí-Wayana majority, the village also has a small Wayampi community.

Geography 

Demographics 
In June 2016, Suisuimënë had 69 inhabitants, of whom 41 were Wayana, 17 were Apalaí and 11 were Wayampi.

Notes

References 
 
 

Populated places in Pará